"Wave" (also known as "Vou Te Contar" in Portuguese; "I am going to tell you" in English) is a bossa nova and jazz standard song written by Antônio Carlos Jobim. Recorded as an instrumental on his 1967 album of the same name, its English lyrics were written by Jobim himself later that year.

The English lyrics were used on the February 11, 1969, recording by Frank Sinatra, on his 1970 album Sinatra & Company. They were also used by Johnny Mathis in his 1970 Close to You album and by Sergio Mendes & Brasil '66 (sung by Lani Hall with Mendes) on their second album, Equinox, in 1967.

The song was voted by the Brazilian edition of Rolling Stone to be the 73rd greatest Brazilian song.

According to The Jazz Discography by Tom Lord, the song has been recorded nearly 500 times by jazz artists.

Notable recordings
 Antonio Carlos Jobim – Wave (1967) and Antonio Carlos Jobim and Friends (1993)
 Elis Regina with Toots Thielemans –  Aquarela do Brasil (1969)
 Oscar Peterson –  Motions and Emotions (1969; arrangement by Claus Ogerman)
 Paul Desmond – Live (1975)
 Joao Gilberto – Amoroso (1976)
 Fred Hersch and Bill Frisell – Songs We Know (1998)
 Ahmad Jamal – The Awakening (1970)
 Frank Sinatra and Antonio Carlos Jobim – Sinatra & Company (1970)
 McCoy Tyner with Ron Carter and Tony Williams – Supertrios (1977)
 Sarah Vaughan – Live in Japan (1973)
 Roberto Carlos and Caetano Veloso – Jobim (2000)
 Eliane Elias – Fantasia (1992) and Brazilian Classics (2003)

References 

Bossa nova songs
Brazilian songs
Frank Sinatra songs
Portuguese-language songs
Songs with lyrics by Antônio Carlos Jobim
Songs with music by Antônio Carlos Jobim
1960s jazz standards
1967 songs
Jazz compositions in D major